Louise Helena Glover is an English model. She is well known for her work as a glamour model, with appearances in British lad mags, including FHM, Bizarre, Maxim, Loaded, and tabloids such as the News of the World, The Sun and Daily Star. She is the first British model to be named "Model of the Year" in Playboy Special Editions.

Early life
Glover had a troubled childhood. She grew up partly in St Helens with her father's family, partly in Great Yarmouth with her mother's, and partly in foster care, which, she says, led to her being bullied and made her a very shy and quiet child. She changed homes and schools many times. At age 15 she was released from foster care and got her own apartment.

Glover had started her modelling career early, when at the age of nine a photographer noticed her on a shopping trip with her mother, and compared her to a young version of Lorraine Chase from the British TV show Emmerdale. Glover found she enjoyed being photographed, and planned to become a professional model from the age of 12. She began entering modelling contests at the age of 14, and beauty pageants, to get noticed as a model. She was a regional finalist for the beauty title Miss Great Britain at the age of 17, and traveled to London to be a national finalist at the age of 18, while studying Holistic Therapy at St Helens College.

At age 17, in 2000, Glover travelled to Belize with a Raleigh International project. The ten weeks in Belize had a great impact on her motivation. "It was the best thing I could have ever done at that point in my life", she said. At age 19, she represented Great Britain in the Miss Earth 2002 in Pasay, Philippines. Soon after, her modelling offers increased tenfold.

Career

2002–2005: modelling work for British newspapers and magazines
Glover began getting paid modelling work in 2002. She became known as a glamour model, appearing topless in British lad mags, including FHM, Bizarre, Maxim, Loaded, and tabloids News Of The World, The Sun and Daily Star. She was featured in TV shows and documentaries including Dream Team, National IQ Test, and Blaggers. She has also appeared as a clothing model, for Ed Hardy clothing, Sex Symbol denim wear, Austin Reed ladies wear, and on front covers, photo shoots and interviews for magazines in South America, USA, Canada, Spain, Sweden, Germany, Russia, South Africa, and Australia.

Glover continued to support Raleigh International after her modelling success, raising funds for the group, and traveling to Malaysia in 2004 to help build a footbridge and teach English to residents of a remote village. She climbed Mount Kinabalu, the highest mountain in Malaysia, to help Raleigh International raise funds.

In August 2005, Glover was sentenced to 240 hours community service by St Helens magistrates after admitting claiming £14,831 in welfare benefits between August 2002 and November 2004 while posing for newspapers and magazines. She stated that she did not know the small and irregular earnings would make a difference to her benefits, and that she had been sometimes too depressed to leave her flat. While performing the community service in 2006, she was assaulted twice by a group of girls, one attack leaving her with a broken nose. This cost her a month of modelling work, and contributed to her depression, but also to her taking kickboxing classes to learn to defend herself.

2005–: Playboy, Penthouse, photography, and career diversification

Glover says appearing in Playboy magazine was an important goal for her ever since becoming a glamour model. She met publisher Hugh Hefner during a photo shoot in Los Angeles, when she was 21. He offered her a test shoot, and she visited the Playboy Mansion. Glover appeared on the cover of Playboy Vixens magazine in January 2006, in the "Top 100 Sexiest Playboy Models" 2006 pictorial special edition, and won Playboy Special Editions Model of the Year 2006; she was the first British winner. To celebrate her success, she was portrayed on the cover and inside a special edition of Playboy Lingerie, which she calls possibly her favourite magazine cover.

Glover became the UK's Penthouse "Pet of the Month" for March 2007 after posing for a celebrity cover and 10 page feature. She has appeared in the American edition of Playboy magazine for September 2007, and on the cover of Playboy France. Her beauty pageants also continued, and after three tries, she won Miss Hawaiian Tropic UK 2007, and competed in the international finals in Las Vegas, Nevada.

, Glover has maintained a web site as a professional photographer since 2004. In 2006 Glover co-launched an adult lingerie online store called Female Bliss, and signed a contract with a Swedish record label as an aspiring singer. In 2007, she appeared in her first music video acting role, for Scouting for Girls' single "She's So Lovely". In 2007, Glover was interested in expanding from glamour modeling into fitness modelling, and was in talks with WWE to become a professional wrestler, which were put on hold due to her lack of US citizenship.

Personal life
, Glover lives in London. She has loved to travel since her early days working for the charity Raleigh International in India and Belize. She spends so much time in the United States that she says she should have been born in America.

Glover's favourite sports pastime is scuba diving in her travels, and her favourite diving location is the Red Sea. She passed her open water certification in Malta, and an advanced scuba diving course in Borneo.

In addition to another conviction for assaulting a police constable in 2001 and a caution for assault occasioning actual bodily harm in 2005; Glover was, in December 2009, found guilty of physically attacking DJ Maxine Hardcastle in the Oceana Club in Brighton. After accusing Glover of showing "complete absence of any sign of remorse" and having perpetrated a "vicious and unprovoked attack," the judge sentenced her to a 30-week suspended prison term for two years and community service.

See also
 List of glamour models

References

External links

 
 

Year of birth missing (living people)
English female models
People from St Helens, Merseyside
Living people
Miss Earth 2002 contestants
Miss Hawaiian Tropic delegates
British beauty pageant winners